Sympenchelys taiwanensis, also known as the Taiwanese worm eel is a species of ophichthid fish found in Taiwan. This species is only known from northeastern and southwestern Taiwan. This species is the only member of its genus.

References

Ophichthidae
Fish described in 2015